Chuchuliga Glacier is the 14 km long and 12 km wide glacier on Oscar II Coast, Graham Land in Antarctica situated southwest of Dzhebel Glacier, northeast of Stob Glacier and south-southeast of Archer Glacier.  It is draining from the slopes of Bruce Plateau, and flowing south-southeastwards to join Crane Glacier.

The feature is named after the settlement of Chuchuliga in southern Bulgaria.

Location
British mapping in 1974.

See also
 List of glaciers in the Antarctic
 Glaciology

Maps
 Antarctic Digital Database (ADD). Scale 1:250000 topographic map of Antarctica. Scientific Committee on Antarctic Research (SCAR). Since 1993, regularly upgraded and updated.

Notes

References
 Chuchuliga Glacier SCAR Composite Antarctic Gazetteer
 Bulgarian Antarctic Gazetteer Antarctic Place-names Commission (Bulgarian)
 Basic data (English)

External links
 Chuchuliga Glacier. Copernix satellite image

Glaciers of Oscar II Coast
Bulgaria and the Antarctic